Karl Eberhard Herwarth von Bittenfeld (4 September 1796 – 2 September 1884) was a Prussian Generalfeldmarschall. He served in many military conflicts throughout the 19th century and was given major commands throughout each conflict.

Origin
Eberhard came from the old Augsburg noble family Herwarth von Bittenfeld, which was established in 1246. He was the son of the Prussian Major General  (1753-1833) and his wife Johanna Friedericke Auguste, née von Arnstedt (1765-1851). Two of his brothers also rose to become generals in the Prussian army:  (1800–1881) and Friedrich Herwarth von Bittenfeld (1802–1884). His education took place initially in his parents' home until the age of 15 when he enrolled in grammar school in Brandenburg an der Havel.

Military Career
Herwarth von Bittenfeld entered the infantry with the 2nd Guards Regiment in 1811, and served through the War of Liberation (1813–15) of the Napoleonic Wars, distinguishing himself at Lützen and Paris as a second lieutenant. During the years of peace he rose slowly to high command. In 1816, Bittenfeld became Premier Leutnant and in 1821, he was promoted to Hauptmann. He married Karoline Schulze in 1823 but she died in 1828. His second marriage was in 1831 with Sophie von Scholten. His second wife died in 1868. In the Berlin revolution of 1848, he was on duty at the royal palace as Colonel of the 1st Foot Guards Regiment. Bittenfeld was promoted to Major-general (German: Generalmajor) in 1852 and became the commander of the Fortress of Mainz. He was promoted to lieutenant-general (German: Generalleutnant) in 1856 and became the commander of the 7th Division. He reached the rank of General of Infantry and the command of the VII Corps in 1860.

In the Second Schleswig War in 1864, Herwarth von Bittenfeld succeeded to the command of the Prussians when Prince Friedrich Karl became commander-in-chief of the allies, and it was under his leadership that the Prussians forced the passage into Als following the victory over General Steinmann on 29 June, ending the war soon after. Bittenfeld was appointed commander of the VIII Corps that autumn. On 29 June he also received the prestigious Pour le Mérite.

In the Austro-Prussian War, Herwarth commanded the Army of the Elbe which overran Saxony and invaded Bohemia by the valley of the Elbe. His troops won the actions of Hühnerwasser and Münchengrätz, and at Königgrätz formed the right wing of the Prussian army. During the Battle of Königgrätz, Herwarth was not able to order heavy attacks against the Austrians since the artillery that Oberst von Bülow brought was too far to attack the Austrian Army. Herwarth himself directed the battle against the Austrian left flank.

Returning to command of the VIII Corps after the war, Herwarth von Bittenfeld became a member of the Reichstag of the North German Confederation from 1867 until 1870; representing the Wittlich-Bernkastel constituency as a conservative. He would continue to plan the defense of western Germany against a possible French offensive until July 1870. 

In 1870, during the Franco-Prussian War, Herwarth von Bittenfeld was not employed in the field, but was in charge of the scarcely less important business of organizing and forwarding all the reserves and material required for the armies in France and later overseeing prisoner of war camps when the threat of French invasion was eliminated. In 1871 he was semi-retired and brevetted Generalfeldmarschall. The rest of his life was spent in retirement at Bonn, where he died in 1884. He was buried next to his second wife. Since 1889 the 13th (1st Westphalian) Infantry Regiment carried his name.

Honours and awards
He received the following orders and decorations:

Notes

References
 Wawro, Geoffrey, The Austro-Prussian War. Austria's war with Prussia and Italy in 1866 (New York 2007).
 
Attribution

Bibliography 

1796 births
1884 deaths
People from Nordhausen (district)
People from the Principality of Halberstadt
German untitled nobility
Field marshals of Prussia
German military personnel of the Franco-Prussian War
People of the Revolutions of 1848
Prussian people of the Austro-Prussian War
Prussian military personnel of the Second Schleswig War
German military personnel of the Napoleonic Wars
Members of the Prussian House of Lords
Recipients of the Pour le Mérite (military class)
Recipients of the Military Merit Cross (Mecklenburg-Schwerin)
Knights Cross of the Military Order of Maria Theresa
Recipients of the Order of the Netherlands Lion
Recipients of the Order of St. Anna, 2nd class
Military personnel from Brandenburg